Attila Szabó (born 19 February 1966 in Komárno) is a Czechoslovak-Slovak sprint canoeist of Hungarian ethnicity who competed from the late 1980s to the late 1990s. He won four medals at the ICF Canoe Sprint World Championships with a gold (K-1 10000 m: 1989), a silver (K-1 10000 m: 1987), and two bronzes (K-1 500 m: 1987, K-1 10000 m: 1993).

Szabó also competed in three Summer Olympics, earning his best finish of fourth in the K-4 1000 m event at Barcelona in 1992.

Footnotes

References
 
 
 

1966 births
Living people
Sportspeople from Komárno
Hungarians in Slovakia
Canoeists at the 1988 Summer Olympics
Canoeists at the 1992 Summer Olympics
Canoeists at the 1996 Summer Olympics
Czechoslovak male canoeists
Olympic canoeists of Czechoslovakia
Olympic canoeists of Slovakia
Slovak male canoeists
ICF Canoe Sprint World Championships medalists in kayak